Kenya–Pakistan relations entails the bilateral relations between Pakistan and Kenya. Both countries are members of the Commonwealth of Nations.

History
Relations between Pakistan and Kenya were first historically established in the 1960s, when Pakistan expressed its support for Kenya in getting independence from British rule.

2004 Joint Ministerial Commission
In 2004, the Pakistan-Kenya Joint Ministerial Commission session was hosted in Nairobi, with intent on boosting bilateral trade and economic relations.

In the forum, the Foreign Minister of Kenya had stated that "Kenya values its friendship with Pakistan" and that "Kenya expresses the desire for further deepening of economic and commercial ties between the two countries." The High Commissioner of Kenya, Mishi Mwatsahu, also appealed to Pakistani businessmen that "they should consider Kenya an attractive country to tap for investment, as Kenya is a gateway for Pakistani investors to enter the big market of 38 African states, which are landlocked to Kenya that has an international seaport of Mombasa." She also further said that "Kenya would fully support Pakistani investors in exploring the potential areas of investment in Kenya. She said Kenya has established the ‘One Stop Window’ facility for foreign investors to facilitate them and making business processes easier for them."

In response, the Commerce Minister of Pakistan welcomed Kenya's aims to strengthen its ties with Pakistan and further stressed the need for exchange of information, business delegations and regular participation in each other's trade fairs. He also pointed out that both the countries should lower down the tariff and non-tariff barriers to expand the trade. In this respect, he hoped that both the countries would be able to make progress in their negotiations on the Preferential Tariff Agreement (PTA).

There are also at least 2,000 Pakistanis who reside in Kenya. In other areas of contention, Pakistan disputed Kenya's claim on the disputed region of the Sudanese border conflicts. But since South Sudan gained independence in 2011 Islamabad changed her stance and supported Kenya instead and rejected Juba's claims.

Development cooperation
Pakistan offers various courses and training programmes to Kenya in Junior level diplomatic courses, Advance diplomatic course for mid career level diplomats, Advance Railway Courses, International Central Banking Course, International Commercial Banking Course and Postal Service Training.

Pakistan has in the past provided relief assistance to Kenya in 2006 and 2011. Kenya also provided assistance to Pakistan during the 2010 floods.

Trade
In 2012, Kenya exported goods worth KES. 256 billion (US$2.8 billion) to Pakistan.

Main exports to Pakistan from Kenya are: coffee, tea, industrial supplies, fuel and transport equipment. Food and beverages make up 45% of the total export values to Pakistan.

Main exports to Kenya from Pakistan are rice.

Pakistan is the second largest export partner destination for Kenyan goods after the UAE in Asia. However, in 2012, Pakistan was the leading export destination for Kenyan goods in Asia.

Diplomatic missions
Kenya maintains a high commission in Islamabad and Pakistan a high commission in Nairobi.

References 

 
Africa–Pakistan relations
Bilateral relations of Pakistan
Pakistan